Pelle Larsen (born September 1, 1979) is a Danish handballer, currently playing for Danish Handball League side Skjern Håndbold. He has previously played for league rivals Ajax København and AaB Håndbold, and has also played abroad, for Spanish club BM Altea.

Larsen has made 7 appearances for the Danish national handball team.

External links
 Pelle Larsen

1979 births
Living people
Danish male handball players